Hari Devarajan, popularly known as H Devaraj, is an Indian cricketer, who has played 38 first-class matches between 1954 and 1968 for Kerala. Devaraj played as a wicket keeper batsman and has scored more than 1000 runs. As per CM Ashok Sekhar, former Kerala captain, Devaraj, could have even played for India if he was with some stronger teams.

References

External links
 

    
1934 births
Living people
Kerala cricketers
Indian cricketers
South Zone cricketers
People from Kochi
Cricketers from Kochi